Kont Investment Bank was a bank operating in Dushanbe, under license from National Bank of Tajikistan.  The bank's chairman was Fayzullo Salikhov. On March 30, 2017, the bank was renamed Bank Asia (Bonki Osiyo), under which name it currently operates.

The Kont Investment Bank was founded in 2011 by Iranian entrepreneur Babak Zanjani, who held investments in several Tajik businesses, including a bank, an airline, a taxi service, and a bus terminal that Tajik President Imomali Rahmon himself helped inaugurate in March 2013.  The bank came under scrutiny by the US Treasury Service, as a possible money laundering entity which was suspected of moving large sums of oil-related money on behalf the Iranian government.

Zanjani reportedly sold the bank in 2015, and it is now wholly owned by R. S. Saidov.

References

Banks of Tajikistan